The term "Free China" may mean:
 Free China (Second Sino-Japanese War), areas of China not under the control of the invading Imperial Japanese Army
 Free area of the Republic of China, a term used by the ROC government to contrast itself with the People's Republic of China and avoid acknowledging their control over mainland China; often shortened to "Free China" and used in contrast to "Red China"
 Free China Journal, a former publication of the government of the Republic of China (Taiwan)
 Free China (junk) (:zh:自由中國號), a Chinese junk boat
 The Free China Movement, a coalition of about 30 pro-democracy and human rights organizations promoting democracy in China
 Free China: The Courage to Believe a 2012 film.
 Free China Relief Association, a Non-Governmental Organization.